Michael Brouwer (born 21 January 1993) is a Dutch footballer who plays as a goalkeeper for Heracles Almelo.

Club career
Brouwer was a product of the youth academies of Vitesse, Twente,  and AGOVV before joining Heracles Almelo in 2013. Brouwer made his professional debut for Heracles in a 2–1 KNVB Cup win over Den Bosch on 25 September 2018. His first appearance came after five years (1912 days) at the club without playing in a professional match.

On 26 June 2021, he joined Emmen on a season-long loan.

International career
Brouwer made one appearance for the Netherlands national under-16 football team in 2009.

References

External links
 
 Heracles Profile

1993 births
Living people
Sportspeople from Apeldoorn
Dutch footballers
Netherlands youth international footballers
Association football goalkeepers
Heracles Almelo players
FC Emmen players
Eredivisie players
Eerste Divisie players
Footballers from Gelderland